7S, 7s, or 7's may refer to :

 Ryan Air Services (IATA code)
 McKinsey 7S Framework, a management model
 Rugby sevens, the seven-a-side version of rugby union
 Canon EOS 7s, a 2004 35 mm film single-lens reflex camera
 7s, 2023 album by Avey Tare

See also
S7 (disambiguation)
Sevens (disambiguation)